Isabel María Sabogal Dunin-Borkowski (Lima, October 14, 1958) is a Polish-Peruvian bilingual novelist, poet, translator of Polish literature into Spanish and astrologer.

Biography 
Her parents were José Rodolfo Sabogal Wiesse (Peruvian, son of the painter José Sabogal) and Józefa Maria Dunin-Borkowska (Polish). Sabogal grew up in Lima, Göttingen and Warsaw and studied Hispanic literature and Linguistics at the Pontifical Catholic University of Peru.

Publications

Books published 
 Requiebros vanos. Poetry book. Lima, Ignacio Prado Pastor Editor, 1988;
 Entre el Cielo y el Infierno, un Universo dividido (Between Heaven and Hell, a divided Universe). Fantasy novel. Lima, Ignacio Prado Pastor Editor, 1989 and reprinted in 1993. Published a second time as Un Universo dividido (A divided Universe), Lima, Ediciones Altazor, 2016. .
 Todo está hecho a la medida de ti misma. Poetry book. Lima, Grafos & Maquinaciones, 2022.

Work published in anthologies 
 Poems in the anthology Poesía: Perú s. XXI (Poetry: Peru XXI century), (compilation by Dalmacia Ruiz Rosas and Willy Gómez Migliaro), Lima, Fundación Yacana, 2007.
 Ricardo Silva Santisteban (anthologist): Antología general de la traducción en el Perú (General anthology of translation in Peru), volume VII. Lima, Universidad Ricardo Palma – Editorial Universitaria, 2016. .
 Short story La vampira (The vampire) in the anthology of the fantastic stories Trece veces Sarah. Un proyecto de José Donayre (Thirteen times Sarah. A project by José Donayre), Lima, Ediciones Altazor, 2017, .
 Poems in the anthology Un otoño azul (A blue autumn), (compilation by Gloria Mendoza Borda). Arequipa, Cuervo Editores – Alianza Francesa de Arequipa, 2018.

Work published within other books 
 El dibujo del mundo (The drawing of the world), text published in the Pedro José Granado's novel Un chin de amor, Lima, Editorial San Marcos, 2005.

Work published in the press 
 Dni poczęcia (The days of conception), Warsaw, Fantastyka magazine, 1990, N° 2, (in Polish).
 In Spanish language: Los días del origen, Relatos increíbles magazine, Nº 19, October 2020. Author's translation.
 A fragment of an unpublished novel Niewiarygodna Bajka (The unbelievable story), Cracow, Lektura magazine, Nº 11/12, 1992, (in Polish). 
 Historia o pewnej qeqe (Story of a "qeqe"), Andean oral tradition compiled and translated by Sabogal to Polish. Salwator i świat magazine, Cracow, 1992, N° 1, (in Polish).
 Poetry, La hoja latinoamericana magazine, Uppsala, 1992 – 1993;
 Poetry, El Sol newspaper, Cusco, 2002 – 2004;
 Cuatro poetas cusqueños (Four poets of Cusco), Lima's cultural magazine Voces, Lima, N° 39, December 2009.
 Notes about Polish history, literature and culture in the Peruvian-Polish press, 2006–2016.
 La hora "U" (The hour "U"), Relatos increíbles magazine, Nº 17, June 2020.
 Nuestra guerra sin fin (Our endless war), Relatos increíbles magazine, Nº 23, January 2022.
 Nuestro pueblo errante (Our wandering people), Relatos increíbles magazine, Nº 26, May 2022.

Translation from Polish into Spanish 
 Polonia: la revolución de Solidarność (Poland: The Solidarność revolution), Lima, Apuntes, Centro de Documentación e Investigación, 1982. It includes Sabogal's translations of the Polish underground writings.
 Sabogal was the editor, translator and wrote the introduction to Poesía escogida (Selected Poetry) of the Polish poet and Nobel Laureate, Czesław Miłosz. A bilingual edition in Polish and Spanish, sponsored by the Polish Embassy in Lima and the American-Peruvian Cultural Institute. Lima, Ediciones del Hipocampo, 2012.

Blog 
 Since 2007 she has been blogging on the Isabel Sabogal platform which includes Sabogal's own work as well as writings on literature, astrology and other subjects.

Cultural management 
 Co-organizer of the III Peruvian Women Writers' Meeting, held in September 2003 in Cusco.
 Co-organizer of the Seminar La mujer y la Literatura (Woman and Literature), held in March 2004 in Cusco.
 Co-organizer of the round table on Czeslaw Milosz, held in November 2011 in Lima, to celebrate the 100th anniversary of the poet's birth.

Distinctions 
 In July 2012 she was awarded the "Bene Merito" Honorary Distinction by the Polish Minister of Foreign Affairs.

Bibliography 
 Rossella di Paolo: Entre el Cielo y el Infierno, Lima, alternative news magazine La tortuga, Nº 31, 1989.
 Carina Moreno: Poesía escogida de Czeslaw Milosz, Lima's cultural magazine Voces, Lima, Nº 49, October 2012.
 Ricardo Silva Santisteban: Breve historia de la traducción en el Perú, Lima, Instituto Bibliográfico del Perú, 2013. .

External links 
 Elton Honores: Isabel Sabogal. Un Universo dividido (Isabel Sabogal. A divided Universe).
 Pedro Granados: Los poetas vivos y más vivos del Perú, y también de otras latitudes (Shrewd and cunning poets of Peru, and also from other latitudes).
 Jorge Monteza: Poesía reunida de Milosz (A compilation Milosz's poetry).
 Carlos Orellana: Dos libros de poesía (Two books of poetry).
 Luis Pacho: Poesía escogida de Czeslaw Milosz (Selected poetry of Czeslaw Milosz).

References 

1958 births
Peruvian women poets
Peruvian women novelists
Peruvian speculative fiction writers
Peruvian translators
Writers from Lima
Peruvian people of Polish descent
Translators to Spanish
Pontifical Catholic University of Peru alumni
Living people
20th-century Peruvian poets
20th-century women writers
Duninowie
Isabel